Malta is an unincorporated community in Lower Mahanoy Township Northumberland County, Pennsylvania, United States. It was formerly known as Vera Cruz.

Malta is located at the intersection of two roads and was described as a "post village" in the History of Northumberland County, Pennsylvania. In the late 19th century, it contained several mechanic shops, a store, a Reformed and Lutheran church, and approximately twelve residences.

References

External links 
Malta Profile

Harrisburg–Carlisle metropolitan statistical area
Unincorporated communities in Northumberland County, Pennsylvania
Unincorporated communities in Pennsylvania